The Domoșița is a right tributary of the river Trotuș in Romania. It discharges into the Trotuș in Văleni, near Adjud.

References

Rivers of Romania
Rivers of Bacău County
Rivers of Vrancea County